The 1950 United States Senate election in Indiana took place on November 7, 1950. Incumbent Republican U.S. Senator Homer Capehart was re-elected to a second term in office, defeating Democrat Alex Campbell.

General election

Candidates
Lester N. Abel (Prohibition)
Homer Capehart, incumbent Senator since 1945 (Republican)
Alexander M. Campbell (Democratic)

Results

See also 
 1950 United States Senate elections

References

1950
Indiana
United States Senate